Koonancheri is a village in the Papanasam taluk of Thanjavur district, Tamil Nadu, India.

Demographics 

At the 2001 census, Koonancheri had a total population of 1341 with 654 males and 687 females. The sex ratio was 1080. The literacy rate was 78.66.

References 

 

Villages in Thanjavur district